Cover sheet may refer to:

 Case Information Statement (or Cover Sheet), is a document which is filed with a court clerk at the commencement of a civil lawsuit in many of the court systems of the United States
 Assignment cover sheet, a paper used by students when completing assignments at university for their courses
 Classified information cover sheets, brightly colored forms affixed to classified documents to identify them as sensitive and shield them from unauthorized access

See also
 Cover letter